Wertheimer is an Ashkenazi Jewish surname. Notable people with the surname include:

Akiba Israel Wertheimer (1778–1835), first Chief Rabbi of Altona and Schleswig-Holstein
 Alain and Gérard Wertheimer, French Jewish billionaire owners of Chanel
Wertheimer et Frère, partnership of the two brothers
 Arjeh Yehuda Wertheimer (1862–1937), known as Constantin Brunner, German-Jewish philosopher
 Egon Ranshofen-Wertheimer (1894–1957), Austrian and German diplomat, journalist, jurist and political scientist 
 Esther Wertheimer (born 1926), Polish architect
  (born 1947), French singer
 Fred Wertheimer (born 1939), American political activist
 Gustav Wertheimer (1847–1904), Austrian artist
 Haim Ernst Wertheimer (1893–1978), German-born Israeli biochemist
 Hedy Wertheimer (1907–1976), Austrian-American Olympic swimmer
 Jack Wertheimer, professor of American Jewish history
 Jacques Wertheimer (1911–1996), father of Pierre
 John Wertheimer (1799–1883), English printer
 Linda Wertheimer (born 1943), American broadcast journalist for National Public Radio
 Martha Wertheimer (1890–1942), German journalist, writer and rescuer of Jewish children from Nazi forces
 Max Wertheimer (1880–1943), Prague-born Gestalt psychologist
 Michael Wertheimer (born 1927), psychologist, son of Max Wertheimer
 Michael Wertheimer (born 1957), American cryptologic mathematician 
 Pierre Wertheimer (1888–1965), French businessman, co-founder of Chanel
 Rabbi Samson Wertheimer (1658–1724), German-Hungarian and Austrian rabbi, philanthropist
 Rabbi Solomon Aaron Wertheimer (1866–1935)
 Stef Wertheimer (born 1926), Israeli industrialist
 Yair Wertheimer (born 1955), Israeli former tennis player

Also 
 Fredric Wertham (originally Friedrich Ignatz Wertheimer, 1895–1981), German-American psychiatrist and author.
 Ella Winter (originally Wertheimer, 1898–1980), Australian-British journalist and activist.

See also 
Wertheim
Wertheim (surname)

German-language surnames
Yiddish-language surnames
Jewish surnames

de:Wertheimer